Microsoft Money was a personal finance management software program by Microsoft. It had capabilities for viewing bank account balances, creating budgets, and tracking expenses, among other features.  It was designed for computers using the Microsoft Windows operating system, and versions for Windows Mobile were also available (available for Money 20002006 on select versions of Windows Mobile, up to, but not including, Windows Mobile 5.0). Microsoft developed Money to compete with Quicken, another personal finance management software.

Money is no longer being actively developed as a retail program. From its inception in 1991 until its discontinuation in 2009, Microsoft Money was commercial software. Microsoft discontinued sales of the software on June 30, 2009, and removed access to online services for existing Money installations in January 2011. In 2010, Microsoft released a replacement version, called Microsoft Money Plus Sunset, which allows users to open and edit Money data files, but lacks any online features or support. It was available in two editions: Deluxe, and Home & Business.

In 2012, Money returned as a Windows Store app; however, this version of Money is designed as a news aggregator for personal finance, investing, and real estate. Other features include stock tracking across the world markets, a mortgage calculator, and a currency converter. It does not have any of the personal accounting and bookkeeping/money management features of the legacy desktop program.

Launched in 2020, Microsoft offers a premium Money in Excel template to Microsoft 365 Family and Personal subscribers. In May 2022, Microsoft announced that this would be withdrawn effective June 30, 2023.

Localization 

There were localized editions of Microsoft Money for the United Kingdom, France, Japan, Canada, and an International English edition for other English speaking countries. However, Microsoft had not updated the U.K., French and international editions since Money 2005. The last Canadian edition was Money 2006.

There were also localized editions for other countries, such as Russia, Brazil, Germany, and Italy. However, these editions were discontinued due to what was believed to be an insufficient user-base to justify the expense of localization for more recent editions or the expense to integrate support for the national online-banking standard like HBCI in Germany.

Microsoft offered a free downloadable time-limited trial version of Microsoft Money Plus. This trial version could import data files from the Canadian edition of Money, but not from other non-US editions. Users upgrading from other non-US editions could manually export and reimport their accounts, and may have had to re-enter certain information by hand.

History 

The first version of Microsoft Money dated back to 1991 and was originally part of the Microsoft Home series.

Due to Microsoft's propensity to market product versions using the year number rather than the actual version number, the version number reported in the About dialogue box may not actually reflect that of the packaging of the distribution media.

Note that a version 13.x was never created.

Release history

Discontinuation of Money 

In August 2008, Microsoft announced that it would stop releasing a new version of Money each year and had no version planned for 2009. The company also announced that it would no longer ship boxed versions of Microsoft Money to retail stores and would instead sell the product only as online downloads.

On June 10, 2009, Microsoft announced that it would stop developing Money, would stop selling it by March 18 of next year, and would continue supporting it until January 31, 2011. The company cited the changing needs of the marketplace as the reason for Money's demise, stating that "demand for a comprehensive personal finance toolset has declined." Product-activation servers used for Money 2007 and beyond were also to be deactivated after January 31, 2011, preventing these versions from being reinstalled after that date.

Money Plus Sunset 

On June 17, 2010, Microsoft announced the release of Money Plus Sunset,  a downloadable version of Money Plus Deluxe and Money Plus Home & Business. Money Plus Sunset does not require online activation or the installation of any previous version of Money on the user's computer, and it should not be installed over the original 2008 version if online services are still required.

Money Plus Sunset comes with most of the functionality that was available in the retail versions of Money Plus. The features missing are:
 Money Plus Sunset cannot import data files from non-US editions of Money
 Money Plus Sunset is missing all the online services features from earlier versions of Money, e.g.:
 automatic statement downloads initiated by Money (though users may import downloadable OFX and QIF statements from one's financial institution into the user's Money file)
 online bill payments
 online investment quotes (though one can "go to the Portfolio Manager and Update Prices – Update Prices Manually")

A few third-party add-ons have been made to overcome the online limitations of the sunset edition:
 MSMoneyQuotes is a for-pay tool to update quotes.  The add-on was written by an ex-Microsoft employee who coded the Portfolio Manager in Money.
 PocketSense is a free tool to download bank account statements (via OFX) and quotes.

Money in Excel 

Launched in 2020, Money in Excel is a Microsoft premium template for Excel available for Microsoft 365 Family and Personal subscribers in the US only.  In May 2022, Microsoft announced that support for Money in Excel would end effective June 30, 2023.

References

External links 
 Microsoft - Download Money Plus Sunset Deluxe
 Money Plus Sunset Page (Internet Archive)
 What Is Microsoft Money Plus Sunset? (Internet Archive)

 Microsoft Office Templates - Money in Excel

 Microsoft Money Home Page (Internet Archive)
 Microsoft Money 1.0 Screenshots

Accounting software
Pocket PC software
Money